This is a list of the wool, cotton and other textile mills in Holmfirth, Kirklees, West Yorkshire.

Austonley Holmfirth

Cartworth Holmfirth

Fulstone Holmfirth

Hepworth Holmfirth

Holme Holmfirth

Honley Holmfirth

Netherthong Holmfirth

Thurstonland Holmfirth

Upperthong Holmfirth

Wooldale Holmfirth

See also
Heavy Woollen District
Textile processing

References

Footnotes

The National Monument Record is a legacy numbering system maintained 
by English Heritage.

References

Bibliography

External links

Holmfirth
Holmfirth
Holmfirth
Holmfirth
Holmfirth
History of the textile industry
Industrial Revolution in England